Baituraza (also written as Bait-ur-Raza, Baitulraza, Bait-ul-Raza, بیت الرضا ) is the shrine of sufi Muslim saint Syed Hakim Ali Shah known in public circles as Aburaza (Abu-ur-Raza). This shrine is situated in Lahore, Punjab, Pakistan.

Syed Hakim Ali Shah, known as Abu-ur-Raza, is a Muslim Sufi saint who started preaching Islam in suburbs of Lahore during early twentieth century.

He inaugurated Baituraza as the common place for those who wished to get wisdom and knowledge of Islam and sufism.

History
Syed Hakim Ali Shah Abu-ur-Raza was born in a small village called Kotli Fateh (although some references mention it to be Kotli Muno as well) near Gujranwala Pakistan. His exact date of birth is not known but some old letters mention it to be around 1885.

He received his early education at home and then travelled to the nearby places to further enhance his knowledge of Quran, Fiqah and Hadith. By the time he was twenty, he was chosen to be the Imam of the local mosque in his native village.

After serving a few years as Imam at the village mosque, he went to Sharaqpur Sharif, the famous dargah of Mian Sher Muhammad Sharaqpuri.

He was welcomed warmly by Mian Sahib and was awarded with the Naqshbandi Khilafat in a very short period of time.

Even some narrator said that Mian Sahib came out of his place and welcomed Sahib saying that he had been waiting for his arrival since long.

Once the Naqshbandi Khilafat was awarded, Sahib expressed his desire to attain the Qadri khilafat as well. Although Mian Sher Muhammad Sharaqpuri initially hesitated to allow him to go for it but Sahib showed a phrase to Mian Sahib from the famous book Futooh-ul-Ghaib and requested for the permission of completion of Qadri Silsila. Mian Sahib finally allowed him to go for it and also prayed for his success. Just before his departure from Sharaqpur Mian Sahib blessed him with his own turban along with the shirt (Kurta) and Aasa.

He then left the city and headed towards the barren lands of East Punjab and central India full of forests and wild animals.

Although there is no verifiable evidence, it seems that around 1920 he finally achieved his goal and being successful he was awarded with the title of Abu-ur-Raza.

He was ordered to move to Lahore and get stationed there. He settled down near a small village Pakki Thatti in the outskirts of Lahore where he stayed until his death in 1940.

On 22 January 1940, he died and a shrine was built by his son Sahibzada Syed Muhammad Siddique Shah Sahib on his grave which is a display of the heights of traditional masonry and artistry combined with the modern architecture.

Urs
A three-day Annual Urs ceremony (Death anniversary) is held at his shrine every year on 18th, 19th and 20th Zil Hajj (12th month of Islamic Lunar Calendar).

Descendants
Originally Syed Hakim Ali Shah had two sons back in his home town Kotli Fateh, Gujrasnwala. It's narrated that Sahib had a special love for Quran and when he used to recite the book, he never talked with anyone, nor he moved. One day he was reciting the Quran in the compound of the village mosque, and it suddenly started snowing heavily that continued until the streets turned totally white. After snowing was stopped people ran towards the mosque to see what happened to Sahib but they were surprised to see that inside the compound there was no snow at all.

Similarly one day he was reciting Quran and his son got sick. His mother sent someone to bring him back home but he ignored and continued recitation. When he finished and went back home, the son had died. Mother got angry and said Ok now Quran belongs to you and you belong to Quran.

The second son Syed Muhammad Siddique Shah moved to Baituraza few years before sahib's death. After the death of his father, Sahibzada Siddique Shah Sahib took over the place and managed it until 1974 when he died due to heart attack.

It was quite unexpected situation, and a very hard time for Baituraza but Sahibzada Syed Muhammad Yusuf-ur-Raza, eldest son of Syed Muhammad Siddique Shah Sahib and grandson of Syed Hakim Ali Shah took over the management responsibilities. He is the current administrator of Darbar Sharif and famous for his unique and simplified description of Quranic verses.

References

External links
 www.baituraza.com Official website

Shrines in Lahore